The 2001–02 NBA season was the Hawks' 53rd season in the National Basketball Association, and 34th season in Atlanta. In the 2001 NBA draft, the Hawks selected Spanish basketball star Pau Gasol with the third overall pick, but soon traded him to the Memphis Grizzlies in exchange for Shareef Abdur-Rahim and first round draft pick Jamaal Tinsley, who was soon traded to the Indiana Pacers. During the off-season, the team signed free agents Ira Newble, Jacque Vaughn and Emanual Davis. However, Theo Ratliff would only play just three games due to a hip injury, and was replaced with Nazr Mohammed as the team's starting center.

The Hawks struggled losing six of their first seven games, then posted a 3–12 record in January as they held a 16–33 record at the All-Star break. The team dealt with injuries all season as Davis only played just 28 games due to a broken left wrist, while Alan Henderson only played just 26 games due to a knee injury, and Chris Crawford only appeared in just seven games also due to a knee injury. However, the team played around .500 for the remainder of the season while posting a 9–7 record in March. The Hawks showed slight improvement avoiding 50 losses by finishing sixth in the Central Division with a 33–49 record. 

Abdur-Rahim had a stellar season averaging 21.2 points, 9.0 rebounds and 1.3 steals per game, and was selected for the 2002 NBA All-Star Game, while Jason Terry averaged 19.3 points, 5.7 assists and 1.8 steals per game, and Mohammed provided the team with 9.7 points and 7.9 rebounds per game. In addition, Toni Kukoč provided with 9.9 points per game off the bench, while Dion Glover contributed 8.9 points per game, second-year forward DerMarr Johnson contributed 8.4 points per game, and Newble averaged 8.0 points and 5.3 rebounds per game. Following the season, Kukoč was traded to the Milwaukee Bucks, and Vaughn signed as a free agent with the Orlando Magic.

Offseason

Draft picks

Roster

Roster Notes
 Point guard Matt Maloney missed the entire season due to a hand injury.

Regular season

Season standings

z - clinched division title
y - clinched division title
x - clinched playoff spot

Record vs. opponents

Game log

Player statistics

Season

Player Statistics Citation:

Awards and records

Transactions

References

See also
 2001-02 NBA season

Atlanta Hawks seasons
Atlanta Haw
Atlanta Haw
Atlanta Hawks